Víctor Estrella Burgos was the defending champion, but lost to Gonzalo Escobar in the second round.

Horacio Zeballos won the title by defeating Nicolás Jarry 6–4, 7–6(11–9) in the final.

Seeds

Draw

Finals

Top half

Bottom half

References
 Main Draw
 Qualifying Draw

Quito Challenger - Singles
2014 Singles